Neil Matthews is the name of:

Neil Matthews (footballer, born 1966), English footballer who played as a forward
Neil Matthews (footballer, born 1967), English-Northern Irish footballer who played as a defender
Neal Matthews Jr., American vocalist